Ikelibeloha is a genus of leafhoppers belonging to the family Cicadellidae.

The species of this genus are endemic to Madagascar.

Species:

Ikelibeloha cristata

References

Cicadellidae
Hemiptera genera